LIBSVM and LIBLINEAR are two popular open source machine learning libraries, both developed at the National Taiwan University and both written in C++ though with a C API. LIBSVM implements the sequential minimal optimization (SMO) algorithm for kernelized support vector machines (SVMs), supporting classification and regression.
LIBLINEAR implements linear SVMs and logistic regression models trained using a coordinate descent algorithm.

The SVM learning code from both libraries is often reused in other open source machine learning toolkits, including GATE, KNIME, Orange and scikit-learn.
Bindings and ports exist for programming languages such as Java, MATLAB, R, and Python.

Both libraries are free software released under the 3-clause BSD license.

References

External links
 LIBSVM homepage
 LIBLINEAR homepage
 LIBLINEAR in R

C++ libraries
Data mining and machine learning software
Free statistical software
Java (programming language) libraries
National Taiwan University
Software using the BSD license
Taiwanese inventions